Machold Rare Violins, domiciled in Bremen, was the global market leader in the historic string instruments trade.

Background
The company was established in 1861 in Markneukirchen as a violin manufacturer. The owner was Dietmar Harry Joachim Machold, born in 1949 and resident at Schloss Eichbüchl bei Katzelsdorf. Of the surviving 600 violins, 60 cellos and 12 violas crafted by Antonio Stradivari in Cremona, Italy, around half have passed through Machold's. The company also sold Guarneri del Gesù violins.  

Dietmar Machold was given the title of honorary professor for a collection of historic violins he procured for the Oesterreichische Nationalbank. 

In June 2011 one anonymous buyer paid $15.9 million for the Lady Blunt Stradivarius.

Criminal investigation
Two bankers from Sparkasse Bremen bank invited Roger Hargrave to inspect their violins, which they believed to be Stradivarius violins. Machold had represented them as such when he offered them as collateral for a multi-million dollar loan. Had the violins been genuine Stradvari their estimated combined sale price would be around $6.8 million. Upon viewing the instruments Hargrave said they were not Stradivari. The violins were also examined by an expert in forestry; in his analysis of the wood used to craft the violins, Micha Beuting concluded that trees had not been felled during Stradivari's lifetime. Beuting also stated that the wood had not come from the Southern Alps, where the spruce trees used by the violin can be found.

The 1765 Carlo Ferdinando Landolfi viola, which had been given to Machold in commission, appeared on a Flessabank list having been used as collateral, but the bank had not received physical possession of the viola. Instead the viola, along with another by Camillus Camilli, had ended up at the Raiffeisenlandesbank Niederösterreich-Wien (Austrian Savings Banks). He then gave the lenders at Flessabank different instruments that didn't belong to him, which were seized during the investigation. Machold told police that he had sold the Rosé Stradivarius in 2006 for €3 million to pay off his loan with BAWAG. However, he had used the violin for collateral with HypoVereinsbank who received nothing. Machold admitted that he "duplicated certificates for violins" when he needed.

46 criminal complaints were filed in Australia, the United States, the Netherlands, Belgium and Germany.

Arrest and Conviction

Dietmar Machold was arrested in Switzerland in March 2011. He was accused of embezzlement and grand commercial fraud, among other things. A further reason for his arrest is the fact that Machold has settled in Switzerland instead of remaining in Austria. In November 2012, Machold was convicted of embezzlement and fraud by an Austrian court. He was sentenced to 6 years in prison.

Organization
Machold had branch establishments in Vienna, Zurich (Geigenbau Machold GmbH and Cadenza AG), Alpnach (Bomalu AG), Bremen, Berlin, New York City, Aspen, Chicago, Seoul and Tokyo, buying and selling, among others, Stradivari and del Gesù violins.

Insolvency proceedings

Personal bankruptcy
Dietmar Machold purchased Eichbüchl Castle in 1997; he paid 1 million deutchemarks for the 700 year old castle, which is located outside Vienna. The castle was sold for €3.5 million, and the collection of period furniture, rugs and library for €120,000.

On October 22, 2010, Dietmar Machold initiated a restructuring proceeding with self-administration with regard to his private assets. On December 1, 2010, the court revoked his right to self-administer his assets. On December 29, 2010, the court appointed a committee of creditors and the proceedings were altered to include insolvency proceedings. The business was ordered to be closed down on February 4, 2011.

Company insolvency

On October 29, 2010, Dietmar Machold initiated a restructuring proceeding with self-administration with regard to his company assets. For this, the court revoked his right to self-administer his assets on November 23, 2010. The company was ordered to be closed down on December 21, 2010 and the proceedings were altered to include insolvency proceedings.

See Also
John & Arthur Beare
Bein & Fushi
List of Stradivarius instruments

References

 http://www.fritz-reuter.com/nantscheff/
 http://www.fritz-reuter.com/DOC/machold/der-spiegel-article-eng.pdf
 http://www.noen.at/lokales/noe-uebersicht/wiener-neustadt/aktuell/Schlossbesitzer-in-Haft;art2575,37135
 http://edikte.justiz.gv.at/edikte/id/idedi8.nsf/suchedi?SearchView&subf=e&SearchOrder=4&Schuldner=machold&BMAZ=NUL&ftquery=&query=%28%5BSchuldner%5D%3D%28machold%29%29
 :de:Machold Rare Violins
 http://www.machold-rare-violins.ch/
 http://www.manta.com/c/mm5144g/machold-rare-violins-ltd
 https://www.nytimes.com/2000/03/12/arts/even-now-music-in-the-family.html
 https://www.faz.net/s/Rub117C535CDF414415BB243B181B8B60AE/Doc~EC3ACA4A5799040558395FB2E5CDE0C5D~ATpl~Ecommon~Scontent.html
 http://www.nj.com/news/index.ssf/2011/04/violin_broker_probed_in_new_je.html

Violin dealers
German companies established in 1861
Defunct companies of Germany
Companies based in Bremen
Markneukirchen
1861 establishments in Bremen
Manufacturing companies established in 1861
Manufacturing companies disestablished in 2010
German companies disestablished in 2010
String instrument manufacturing companies